"Je nous veux" (meaning "I Want Us") is a song recorded by Canadian singer Celine Dion, released on 13 February 2017 as the third single from Encore un soir (2016) in Canada. The song was written by Nelson Minville and Marc Dupré, and produced by Humberto Gatica and Scott Price.

Commercial performance
In early September 2016, after the release of Encore un soir, "Je nous veux" entered the French Digital Singles Chart at number 142 and the French Overall Singles Chart at number 143. At the same time, it also entered the Quebec Digital Singles Chart at number ten. In March 2017, "Je nous veux" entered the Canadian Adult Contemporary chart and peaked at number thirty-eight. It became the third top forty single from Encore un soir on the Canadian AC chart. In mid-April 2017, "Je nous veux" reached number ten on the Quebec Radio Chart.

Charts

Release history

References

External links

2016 songs
2017 singles
Celine Dion songs
French-language songs
Songs written by Marc Dupré